The Synod of Ancyra was an ecclesiastical council, or synod, convened in Ancyra (modern-day Ankara, the capital of Turkey), the seat of the Roman administration for the province of Galatia, in 314.  The season was soon after Easter; the year may be safely deduced from the fact that the first nine canons are intended to repair havoc wreaked in the church by persecution, which ceased after the overthrow of Maximinus II in 313. Only about a dozen bishops were present, nonetheless representing nearly every part of Syria and Asia Minor. Either Vitalis, Bishop of Antioch, or Marcellus of Ancyra presided, and possibly both were present, although the Libellus Synodicus, also known as the Synodicon Vetus, assigns to the latter.

The tenth canon tolerates the marriages of deacons who previous to ordination had reserved the right to take a wife.

The thirteenth forbids chorepiscopi to ordain presbyters or deacons.

The sixteenth canon brackets the Christians who have committed bestiality, or may still have been doing so, into several different groups based on the offender's age, and assigns different penances to each group; married men over 20 were sanctioned more harshly than unmarried youths, and married men over 50 received the harshest sanctions.

The seventeenth canon condemns the Christians who have either committed bestiality or had sexual intercourse with a leprous woman, while themselves being leprous, to having to pray with the wintering people - i.e. outside church buildings.
The equation of leprous women with beasts is generally considered difficult to interpret.

The eighteenth safeguards the right of the people in objecting to the appointment of a bishop whom they do not wish. 

Canon XXII: Concerning wilful murderers let them remain prostrators; but at the end of life let them be indulged with full communion.

Canon XXIV imposes five years of penance upon those who consult magicians.

References

Attribution

External links 
 Canons of the Council of Ancyra

Ancyra
314
310s in the Roman Empire
Events in Ankara
Christian clerical marriage
Zoophilia